Andrew James Headley Holgate (born 31 December 1958 in Reigate) is a British journalist and critic. Since 2008 he has served as Literary Editor of The Sunday Times.

Holgate studied Modern History at Durham University.

References

1958 births
Living people
The Sunday Times people
Alumni of St Cuthbert's Society, Durham